Ochiai Dam is a gravity dam located in Gifu Prefecture in Japan. The dam is used for power production. The catchment area of the dam is 1747 km2. The dam impounds about 45  ha of land when full and can store 3872 thousand cubic meters of water. The construction of the dam was started on 1925 and completed in 1926.

References

Dams in Gifu Prefecture